The 1969 Arizona Wildcats football team represented the University of Arizona in the Western Athletic Conference (WAC) during the 1969 NCAA University Division football season.  In their first season under head coach Bob Weber, the Wildcats compiled a 3–7 record (3–3 against WAC opponents), finished in fifth place in the WAC, and were outscored by their opponents, 276 to 219.  The team played its home games in Arizona Stadium in Tucson, Arizona.

Weber replaced Darrell Mudra, who left Arizona to become the head coach at Western Illinois at the end of the 1968 season. Without Mudra in charge, the Wildcats struggled heavily, which led to Arizona losing its first four games of the 1969 season and only winning only three games all year.

The team's statistical leaders included Brian Linstrom with 1,598 passing yards, Ron Gardin with 759 rushing yards, and Hal Arnason with 489 receiving yards.

Schedule

References

Arizona
Arizona Wildcats football seasons
Arizona Wildcats football